The following television stations operate on virtual channel 69 in the United States:

 KSOY-LD in McAllen, Texas
 KSWB-TV in San Diego, California
 W24CS-D in Reading, Pennsylvania
 WAMI-DT in Hollywood, Florida
 WDTI in Indianapolis, Indiana
 WFMZ-TV in Allentown, Pennsylvania
 WMYS-LD in South Bend, Indiana
 WPTG-CD in Pittsburgh, Pennsylvania
 WPXQ-TV in Block Island, Rhode Island
 WQAW-LD in Lake Shore, Maryland
 WUPA in Atlanta, Georgia

References

69 virtual